Nizhneye Kerchevo is a rural locality (a village) in Cherdynsky District, Perm Krai, Russia. The population was 99 as of 2010. There are 5 streets.

Geography 
Nizhneye Kerchevo is located 94 km southwest of Cherdyn (the district's administrative centre) by road. Kerchevsky is the nearest rural locality.

References 

Rural localities in Cherdynsky District